Hans Skramstad (26 December 1797 – 15 June 1839) was a Norwegian pianist and composer.

Music
Brilliant variations on "Stusle sundagskvelden" for piano

External links
 Nils Grinde: Hans Skramstad

Norwegian male composers
1797 births
1839 deaths
19th-century pianists
Norwegian male pianists
19th-century male musicians